Lisa Raymond and Samantha Stosur were the defending champions, but lost in the quarterfinals to Květa Peschke and Rennae Stubbs.

Cara Black and Liezel Huber won in the final 2–6, 6–0, 10–8, against Květa Peschke and Rennae Stubbs.

Seeds

  Cara Black /  Liezel Huber (champions)
  Květa Peschke /  Rennae Stubbs (final)
  Shahar Pe'er  /   Virginia Ruano Pascual (first round)
  Bethanie Mattek /  Vladimíra Uhlířová (first round)

Draw

Draw

External links
Draw

Doubles
International Women's Open